Duti is a given name and surname. It may refer to:

Cosimo Duti (active 1588 - died 1630), Italian painter 
Duti Krushna Panda (1923–2019), Indian politician and leader of Communist Party of India

See also
Duti Monor Jonak, Assamese romantic drama TV series
Dutti (disambiguation)